Heliothelopsis is a genus of moths of the family Crambidae.

Species
Heliothelopsis arbutalis (Snellen, 1875)
Heliothelopsis costipunctalis (Barnes & McDunnough, 1914)
Heliothelopsis unicoloralis (Barnes & McDunnough, 1914)

References

Odontiini
Crambidae genera
Taxa named by Eugene G. Munroe